Berengrave Chalk Pit is a   Local Nature Reserve in Rainham in Kent. It is owned and managed by Medway Council.

There is a small lake in a disused chalk pit, and other habitats are scrub, woodland and reedbeds, which flood an area of willow carr.

There is access from Berengrave Lane.

References

Local Nature Reserves in Kent